Inowrocław railway station is a railway station serving the town of Inowrocław, in the Kuyavian-Pomeranian Voivodeship, Poland. The station opened in 1872 and is located on the Chorzów–Tczew railway and Poznań–Skandawa railway. The train services are operated by PKP and Przewozy Regionalne.

The station is an important junction for trains towards northern Poland, via Bydgoszcz and to eastern Poland via Toruń. There is a large freight yard west of the station, as well as freight lines avoiding the station.

Modernisation

Modernisation work of the station has been ongoing since September 2013 with it expected to be completed in 2017.

Train services
The station is served by the following services:

EuroCity services (EC) (EC 95 by DB) (IC by PKP) Berlin - Frankfurt (Oder) - Rzepin - Poznan - Inowroclaw - Bydgoszcz - Gdansk - Gdynia
Intercity services Wroclaw / Zielona Gora - Poznan - Inowroclaw - Bydgoszcz - Gdansk - Gdynia
Intercity services Krakow - Lodz - Kutno - Konin - Poznan - Inowroclaw - Bydgoszcz
Intercity services Wroclaw / Zielona Gora - Poznan - Inowroclaw - Torun - Ilawa - Olsztyn - Elk - Bialystok
Regional services (R) Poznan - Gniezno - Mogilno - Inowroclaw - Bydgoszcz
Regional services (R) Poznan - Gniezno - Mogilno - Inowroclaw - Torun

References

 This article is based upon a translation of the Polish language version as of October 2016.

External links

Railway stations in Poland opened in 1872
Railway stations in Kuyavian-Pomeranian Voivodeship
Inowrocław County